Selwyn Milborrow, (21 August 1967) is a South African author, poet and freelance journalist. Some of his works published in English, Afrikaans and Dutch are studied in South African high schools and prescribed at Universities.

Early years

Milborrow's love for literature and poetry was triggered at an early age. Growing up under apartheid era his father introduced him to   political writings of authors such as Tolstoy and Normal Vincent Peale. Milborrow used his writings to express his anger and frustrations on the apartheid policies.

Published works

Milborrow's books include themes of politics, spirituality, academic and fantasy. He has published three poetry books that are currently used in high schools.

Publications
 The Write Side
 Diglossos
 Shades of Forgiveness

References

Living people
South African writers
1967 births